The Alcoholic Beverage Labeling Act (ABLA) of the Anti-Drug Abuse Act of 1988, is a United States federal law requiring that (among other provisions) the labels of alcoholic beverages carry a warning label.

The warning reads:

The ABLA also contains a declaration of policy and purpose, which states that the United States Congress finds that

Research evidence suggests that the current American fetal warnings aren't very effective. Many people don't notice them.

The labels have been criticized for being so poorly-designed as to be almost useless. They are small, black-and-white, and entirely text-based, unlike tobacco packaging warning messages, which now mostly use images. Although drinking alcohol is harmful to health under all circumstances, the labels warn only about not drinking under specific circumstances, with messages about impaired driving and fetal alcohol spectrum disorders. All of these traits have been shown to make labels less effective, in lab and virtual studies. Tim Stockwell, one of the researchers designing the Northern Territories Alcohol Labels Study, described evidence on the effectiveness of the labels mandated by the Alcoholic Beverage Labeling Act as "pretty moot because the labels are so bad."

References

1988 in law
United States federal controlled substances legislation
Alcohol law in the United States